Artemis Investment Management LLP and its subsidiary Artemis Fund Managers Limited are a UK–based fund management business, offering a range of funds which invest in the UK, Europe, the US and around the world.

Clients' investments are spread across a range of funds, two investment trusts, a venture capital trust, and both pooled and segregated institutional portfolios.

History

Artemis was founded in 1997. In 2002 a majority stake was acquired by ABN AMRO; that stake subsequently passed to Fortis. 
Following a management buyout in 2010, Artemis is owned by Affiliated Managers Group (AMG) and the Artemis partners. This is a financial partnership: AMG does not get involved in the day-to-day running of the business.

Artemis is a Limited Liability Partnership (LLP) and currently has 29 partners, comprising fund managers and other key individuals at the firm. The founders have always recognised that one of the key determinants in long-term success is the stability of the investment team.

Operations
The firm's clients include retail investors, financial advisers and institutional investors such as pension funds and financial institutions. The firm has offices in Edinburgh and London and, as at 30 September 2020, it managed £23.1 billion of assets.

Headquarters
The firm's offices are at Cassini House, 57 St James's Street, London SW1A 1LD and 6th floor, Exchange Plaza, 50 Lothian Road, Edinburgh EH3 9BY

References

External links
 
 Artemis Great Kindrochit

Investment management companies of the United Kingdom
Companies based in the City of Westminster
Financial services companies established in 1997